A kraakdoos or cracklebox is a custom-made instrument, in the form of a noise-making electronic device. It is a small box with six metal contacts on top, which generate various unusual sounds and tones when pressed by the performer's fingers. The human body becomes a part of the circuit and determines the range of sounds possible, thus different people–or the same person at different times–shall generate different results.

While there are certain configurations of one's digits that result in more or less recallable results the preferred way of playing it is led by listening to how the instrument responds to manipulation and then maintaining and modifying one's contact points. The player thus enters into a tactile and sonic dialogue with the instrument.

The concept was first conceived by Michel Waisvisz and Geert Hamelberg in the 1960s, and developed further in the 1970s when Waisvisz joined the STEIM foundation in Amsterdam, Netherlands. The kraakdoos is a simple device, based on a single operational amplifier (one of the earliest models to be produced) and a few transistors, and can be constructed with only a basic understanding of electronics.

The musician Andrew Levine plays the Cracklebox regularly as part of his setup, in which it is the only instrument not dependent on external amplification, and has also experimented with a four-Cracklebox-configuration.

See also 
 Atari Punk Console
 Circuit bending

External links 
 Archived Cracklebox page at STEIM
 Original shematics and DIY page
 The CrackleBox — includes a history
  De Kraakdoos
 The Cracklebox in various configurations

Experimental musical instruments
Electronic musical instruments
DIY culture
Dutch inventions